The Varsity Cup Championship was an American college rugby competition established in 2012 to serve as an invitational championship following the breakaway of several schools from Division 1-A Rugby.

The Varsity Cup was organized by United World Sport, the organization which also ran the USA Sevens tournament and the Collegiate Rugby Championship.
The 2014 Varsity Cup final was televised by NBC Sports on NBCSN. The Varsity Cup's ability to get onto television was seen as a boost to the Varsity Cup and to the rugby programs of the member schools.

The development of the Varsity Cup post-season tournament created some controversy. The Varsity Cup Championship did not replace Division 1-A Rugby, but it was endorsed by USA Rugby. The schools participating in the Varsity Cup often referred to it as the national championship, but with the rival Division 1-A Rugby post-season tournament running concurrently, USA Rugby did not consider the Varsity Cup to be the national championship.

The founding schools formed the Varsity Cup with a number of goals in mind. One was the ability to manage and control their playoff games. Another was to develop a tournament with commercial appeal, that would generate revenue from attendance and concessions, and that would generate marketing exposure through TV coverage.

The Varsity Cup folded in November 2017 when the organizer, broadcast partner and a major sponsor, Penn Mutual, withdrew their support.

Teams

The teams invited to compete in the Varsity Cup were from schools where rugby enjoyed varsity status or advanced club status.

Utah was supposed to be one of the eight teams participating in the 2013 inaugural Varsity Cup, but the Utah rugby team was suspended by the school, with Central Washington replacing Utah in the 2013 Varsity Cup. 
Arkansas State committed in 2014 to join the Varsity Cup beginning in 2015, in significant part due to the ability of the tournament to improve the name recognition of the school's rugby program.
Arizona State joined the Varsity Cup in 2015 to increase the prowess of their Olympic athletes.
Oklahoma was supposed to participate in the 2015 Varsity Cup but had to forfeit their scheduled match vs. Utah due to the use of ineligible players.

Results

Summary

Note: BYU's 2015 victory was vacated because BYU fielded an ineligible player.
Upon the discovery and further questions of the usage of ineligible players by BYU, the team left the Varsity Cup and rejoined D1-A.

2013

2014

2015 

Note: BYU's 2015 victory was vacated because BYU fielded an ineligible player.

2016 

Italicized teams hosted each round.

2017 

Italicized teams hosted each round.

Records
Most points for one team (single match):
 136 — California vs Texas (2016)
 113 — BYU vs Arizona State (2016)
 100 — California vs Texas (2015)
 100 — Penn State vs Harvard (2017)

List of broadcasters 
The following table shows the broadcasters for each year's final match.

See also
 Division 1-A Rugby
 Collegiate Rugby Championship
 Intercollegiate sports team champions

References

External links
Official Site

College rugby union competitions in the United States
2012 establishments in the United States